Microbacterium ginsengisoli is a Gram-positive, heterotrophic, strictly aerobic bacterium from the genus Microbacterium which has been isolated from soil from a ginseng field in Daejeon, South Korea.

References

Further reading

External links
Type strain of Microbacterium ginsengisoli at BacDive -  the Bacterial Diversity Metadatabase	

Bacteria described in 2008
ginsengisoli